Cheung Shan, is a mountain on Lantau Island in Hong Kong at  in height. It is one of the Four Guardian Beasts (四靈獸) of Tai O Village.

See also 
 List of mountains, peaks and hills in Hong Kong
Fu Shan (Tiger)

References